"Dooo It!" is a song by American singer Miley Cyrus from her fifth studio album Miley Cyrus & Her Dead Petz (2015). It was premiered on August 30, 2015, with a live performance during the 2015 MTV Video Music Awards, which Cyrus hosted, and was made available free online without prior announcement alongside the parent album. It serves to promote the project.

Composition
Lyrically, "Dooo It!" is "primarily about [Cyrus'] love of marijuana and peace". NY Daily News said the song "hits some new sweet spot between loopy R&B and the more drug-friendly forms of Southern hip hop".

Live performances
Cyrus first performed the song as a collaborative effort with The Flaming Lips and dozens of RuPaul's Drag Race contestants in haute couture designs for the 2015 MTV Video Music Awards, which she hosted. RuPaul's Drag Race contestants, including Courtney Act, Willam Belli, Pandora Boxx, Tammie Brown, Carmen Carrera, Violet Chachki, Alyssa Edwards, Monica Beverly Hillz, Laganja Estranja, Alexis Mateo, Gia Gunn, Miss Fame, Pearl, Shangela Laquifa Wadley, and Jessica Wild, were featured in the performance. The Flaming Lips frontman Wayne Coyne came to the front of the stage to launch confetti cannons between Cyrus' legs at the end of the song.

Music video
The music video for "Dooo It!" features a close-up shot of Cyrus smoking marijuana, licking and regurgitating glitter and pouring home-made facial masks on her face. It was shot in July 2015. Billboard Erin Strecker said of the video: "It's gross, intriguing, performance art-y and may make you want to take up crafting, stat." Jezebel described it as "glitter bukkake", and The Harvard Crimson suggests that "[i]f you look closely enough, given that you have the stomach to do so, you can probably see the seven deadly sins represented. Perhaps in 'Dooo It!,' Cyrus, like John Doe in that one Fincher flick, merely holds a mirror to her morally empty society. If we recoil in horror, it is hardly the mirror's fault."

Charts

References

External links
 
 Dooo It (Live), MTV (2015)

2015 songs
Experimental music
Miley Cyrus songs
Song recordings produced by Miley Cyrus
Songs about cannabis
Songs written by Miley Cyrus
Songs written by Steven Drozd
Songs written by Wayne Coyne